The Maternal and Child Health Journal is a quarterly peer-reviewed medical journal covering maternal and child health. It was established in 1997 and is published by Springer Science+Business Media. It is sponsored by, among other organizations, the Association of Maternal and Child Health Programs, the Association of Teachers of Maternal and Child Health, and CityMatCH. The editor-in-chief is Timothy Dye (University of Rochester School of Medicine). According to the Journal Citation Reports, the journal has a 2016 impact factor of 1.788.

References

External links

Obstetrics and gynaecology journals
Publications established in 1997
Springer Science+Business Media academic journals
Pediatric nursing journals
Quarterly journals
English-language journals
Academic journals associated with learned and professional societies